NACS can refer to:

Groups, companies, organizations
 National Association of Cambodian Scouts
 National Association of Convenience Stores
 North-American Catalan Society
 Northwest Allen County Schools
 Team Nacs, Japanese theatrical and music group

Competitions, sports, games
 North American Challenge Skate
 North American League of Legends Challenger Series

Other uses
 North American Charging Standard developed by Tesla Motors

See also

 
 
 
 NAC (disambiguation)